Plutonic Airport  serves the Plutonic Gold Mine, Western Australia.

The airport is serviced by Cobham Aviation charter flights from Perth Airport for the Plutonic Gold Mine.

See also
 List of airports in Western Australia
 Aviation transport in Australia

References

External links
 Airservices Aerodromes & Procedure Charts

Airports in Western Australia
Mid West (Western Australia)